The Pine Bluff Metropolitan Statistical Area, as defined by the United States Census Bureau, is a three-county region in southeast Arkansas, anchored by the city of Pine Bluff.  As of the 2010 census, the MSA had a population of 100,258.   The metro area's population declined by 12.47% between 2010 and 2020, more than any other metropolitan area in the United States. It is also a component of the larger Little Rock-North Little Rock, AR Combined Statistical Area which had 902,443 people in the census estimates of 2014.

Counties
Cleveland
Jefferson
Lincoln

Cities and towns
Altheimer
Grady
Gould
Humphrey
Kingsland
New Edinburg (unincorporated)
Pine Bluff (Principal city)
Redfield
Rison
Sherrill
Star City
Wabbaseka
White Hall

See also

Arkansas metropolitan areas

References